Design education is the teaching of theory and application in the design of products, services and environments, and focusses on the development of both particular and general skills for designing. It is primarily orientated to preparing students for professional design practice, and based around project work and studio or atelier teaching methods.

There are also broader forms of higher education in design studies and design thinking, and design also features as a part of general education, for example within Design and Technology. The development of design in general education in the 1970s led to a need to identify fundamental aspects of ‘designerly’ ways of knowing, thinking and acting, and hence to the establishment of design as a distinct discipline of study.

Institutions for design education date back to the nineteenth century. The Norwegian National Academy of Craft and Art Industry was founded in 1818, followed by the United Kingdom's Government School of Design (1837), Konstfack in Sweden (1844), and Rhode Island School of Design in the United States (1877). The German art and design school Bauhaus, founded in 1919, greatly influenced modern design education.

In 1970, in Japan, South Korea, and Singapore there were no design schools.  However, as of the early 2000s there are more than 23 design schools within the three Asia countries.

See also
Design
STEAM fields

References

Other sources
 Salama, Ashraf M. A., and Nicholas Wilkinson. 2007. Design studio pedagogy: Horizons for the future. Gateshead, U.K.: Urban International Press.
Michl, Jan. 2006. "A case against the modernist regime in design education"
 Wang, Tsungjuang. 2010. "A New Paradigm for Design Studio Education." International Journal of Art & Design Education. 

Design